Choonhae College is a private technical college located in Ulsan metropolitan city, in southeastern South Korea.  The current president is Bok-yong Kim (김복영).  Founded as a nursing school, the college continues to have a strong focus on medical studies, and also operates a hospital.

Academics

The college's academic offerings are almost exclusively medicine-related, being provided by departments of Nursing, Counselling Psychology, Yoga, Social Welfare, Therapeutic Special Education for Children, and Computer Information Technology.

History
The college was founded in 1968 as Choonhae Nursing School (춘해간호학교).

See also
List of colleges and universities in South Korea
Education in South Korea

External links
Official school website, in English

Universities and colleges in Ulsan
Nursing schools in South Korea
1968 establishments in South Korea
Educational institutions established in 1968